Andre Maurice Powell (born June 5, 1969) is a former American football linebacker in the National Football League (NFL) who played for the New York Giants. He played college football at Penn State University.

References 

1969 births
Living people
Players of American football from Baltimore
American football linebackers
Penn State Nittany Lions football players
New York Giants players